Fernando Marías Amondo (13 June 1958 – 5 February 2022) was a Spanish writer.

Biography 
Born on 13 June 1958 in Bilbao, Biscay, Marías moved to Madrid in 1975 to study cinema at the university. His debut novel (which he later adapted to a feature film screenplay in The End of a Mystery) was published in 1990. He won the 2001 Premio Nadal for El niño de los coroneles. He died in Madrid on 5 February 2022, at the age of 63.

Works 

Novels
 La luz prodigiosa (1990)
 Esta noche moriré (1992)
  (2001)
 Invasor (2003)
 La mujer de las alas grises (2003)
 El mundo se acaba todos los días (2005)
 Cielo abajo (2005)
 Zara y el librero de Bagdad (2008)
 Todo el amor y casi toda la muerte (2010)
 La isla del padre (2015)
 Arde este libro (2021)

References

External links 
 

1958 births
2022 deaths
20th-century Spanish writers
21st-century Spanish writers
Basque writers
People from Bilbao
Spanish novelists
Spanish screenwriters